Peter Nielsen may refer to:

Sports
Peter Nielsen (footballer) (born 1968), Danish footballer
Peter Nielsen (sport shooter) (1890–1972), Danish Olympic shooter
Peter Heine Nielsen (born 1973), Danish chess grandmaster
Peter Meinert Nielsen (born 1966), Danish road bicycle racer

Others
Peter Nielsen (actor) (1876–1949), Danish film actor
Peter Nielsen (botanist) (1829–1897), Danish botanist, mycologist and plant pathologist
Peter E. Nielsen, Danish biochemist, a inventor of Peptide nucleic acid
Peter Alsing Nielsen (1907–1985), Danish painter
Peter Nielsen (died 2004), Danish-born Swiss air traffic controller at the time of the 2002 Überlingen mid-air collision 
Peter Nielsen, contestant on series four of the Irish TV series The Apprentice

See also
Peter Neilson (disambiguation)